Chiêm Hoá is a rural district of Tuyên Quang Province in the Northeast region of Vietnam. As of 2003 the district had a population of 132,722. The district covers an area of 1456 km². The district capital lies at Vĩnh Lộc.

Administrative divisions
Vĩnh Lộc, Linh Phú, Tri Phú, Bình Nhân, Kiên Đài, Bình Phú, Yên Lập, Phú Bình,  Ngọc Hội, Kim Bình, Vinh Quang, Nhân Lý, Hòa An, Trung Hòa, Phúc Thịnh, Tân Thịnh, Yên Nguyên, Hòa Phú, Xuân Quang, Hùng Mỹ, Tân An, Hà Lang, Tân Mỹ, Trung Hà, Minh Quang.

References

Districts of Tuyên Quang province
Tuyên Quang province